Gaziantep Synagogue, also known as the Great Synagogue of Gaziantep, is an abandoned synagogue located in Gaziantep in south-central Turkey. It was closed after the last remaining members of Gaziantep's Jewish population left the city in the 1970s and was in a state of disrepair. Through the collaboration between the Jewish community in Turkey and the government, the synagogue was restored in 2012. In 2014 it was opened to visitors. In December 2019 a Hannukah celebration with 200 people was held.  

The synagogue was a two-story, stone building large enough to accommodate several hundred worshippers. The date of its construction is unknown.

See also
 List of synagogues in Turkey

External links

 Chief Rabbinate of Turkey
 Shalom Newspaper - The main Jewish newspaper in Turkey

References

Synagogues in Turkey
Buildings and structures in Gaziantep